Worms World Party is a 2001 artillery turn-based tactics video game. It is the sequel to Worms Armageddon in the Worms series by Team17. As with the previous games in the series, players take turns controlling their teams and using available projectiles, firearms, explosives, and equipment to destroy all opposing teams and manoeuvre across a specified and highly destructible map.

Although fairly well received upon release, the overall reception of Worms World Party has subsequently become mixed amongst the Worms community. Some found it to be an improvement to an already good game, whilst others saw it as being too derivative of its predecessor and not worthwhile for Worms Armageddon players. Worms World Party was the last two-dimensional title in the main series before transitioning to 3D graphics, with Worms 3D as the first fully 3D Worms title.

Gameplay

Like its predecessors, Worms World Party is a side-scrolling video game involving controlling a team of worms and using a collection of weaponry to eliminate any opposing teams. The worms can walk and jump around and use tools such as the ninja rope and parachute to move to otherwise unreachable locations.

The worms have an arsenal of dozens of weapons, ranging from longbows to bazookas and from fireball to Holy Hand Grenades. There are also an array of special weapons, such as Armageddon (meteor shower) or the infamous Concrete Donkey. Some of these weapons are present in the worms' initial arsenal while others can be collected from randomly appearing crates during the game. For some weapons, such as grenades, holding the launching key longer shoots them further. The landscape can be deformed with any weapon, forcing the players to adapt to changing environments. Also, in addition to the nature-made obstacles, the maps may contain land mines which explode when a worm comes close to one, and barrels which explode when shot, spreading out some burning napalm. These often lead to very technical combinations where, for example, a worm is first hit with a grenade and is then thrown against a mine which sets off another worm, which hits a third worm who slips into the water.

The image illustrates a match between three teams of worms in a pirate-themed map. Over their heads the worms have their names and hit points. The color of the text indicates the team the worm belongs to. Each team can be customized by the player's will, including the language the worms speak and the headstone that is left when a worm dies. The worms can also be drowned, in which case no headstone is left. In the bottom of the screen the remaining time and the wind speed are shown. When the time runs out, the water level starts to raise on each turn, drowning the worms at the lowest points of the map (this is called Sudden Death). The wind speed affects some weapons. Failing to account for it may turn a missile back into the worm who launched it.

The player can play against the computer, or can play against people on the same computer or over the Internet or local area network (TCP/IP and IPX supported).

The player can set up many options and make maps one can play on prior to battle to tailor the experience. There are also single-player and multiplayer missions available to help refine the player's skills with the various weapons and utilities.

Development
After releasing Worms Armageddon, Team17 had plans to develop a fully three-dimensional iteration of Worms, resulting in the 2003 launch of Worms 3D. Worms Armageddon was meant to be the final game in the series using two-dimensional visuals, but Sega approached the company and asked them to develop an online version for the Dreamcast. Worms World Party is the first Worms game in which Andy Davidson, the franchise's creator, had no involvement since his departure from Team17 (Davidson later returned to the company in 2012).

Worms World Party was ported to Pocket PCs by JAMDAT Mobile on 3 October 2003. There was a port due to launch on the Gizmondo platform, but that was ultimately cancelled because of the console's short lifespan.

Worms World Party Remastered
A remaster of the game, Worms World Party Remastered, was released to Steam and GOG.com on July 16, 2015. The game is "remastered in 1080p and at 60fps", with new sound effects.

Reception

Mike Wolf reviewed the Dreamcast version of the game for Next Generation, rating it four stars out of five, and stated that "even with the online issues, this is Worms at its finest – quick, easy, fun worm-blasting action".

The Dreamcast, PC, Game Boy Advance and N-Gage versions received "generally favorable reviews" according to the review aggregation website Metacritic. The main complaint in the individual reviews is that Worms World Party is too similar to Worms Armageddon with merely incremental improvements.

World Partys computer version received a "Silver" sales award from the Entertainment and Leisure Software Publishers Association (ELSPA), indicating sales of at least 100,000 copies in the United Kingdom. Worms World Party was ranked  30, 70, and 94 of PC PowerPlays top 100 PC games of all time in 2001, 2003, and 2004, respectively. It was voted by about 1.22 million gamers as the second runner-up for the Mobile Game of the Year in the Golden Joystick Awards 2009. Pocket Gamer retrospectively listed the port for N-Gage versions 1.0 and 2.0 as one of the twenty best games for the gaming phone.

References

External links
 
 
 

2001 video games
04
Artillery video games
Dreamcast games
Game Boy Advance games
Cancelled Gizmondo games
Multiplayer and single-player video games
N-Gage games
N-Gage service games
PlayStation (console) games
Strategy video games
THQ games
Titus Software games
Ubisoft games
Virgin Interactive games
Video games scored by Bjørn Lynne
Video games scored by Mark Cooksey
Video games using procedural generation
Windows games
Windows Mobile games
Video games developed in the United Kingdom
JAMDAT Mobile games
Paragon Five games